Gulf of Yalta is a gulf in the Black Sea near Yalta, Crimea.

References

Bays of Crimea
Gulfs of the Black Sea